The 2014 Central Michigan Chippewas football team represented Central Michigan University in the 2014 NCAA Division I FBS football season. They were led by fifth-year head coach Dan Enos and played their home games at Kelly/Shorts Stadium. They were members of the West Division of the Mid-American Conference. They finished the season 7–6, 5–3 in MAC play to finish in fourth place in the West Division. They were invited to the inaugural Bahamas Bowl where they lost to Western Kentucky.

On January 22, 2015, head coach Dan Enos resigned to take the offensive coordinator position at Arkansas. He finished at CMU with a record of 26–36.

Schedule

Game summaries

Chattanooga

at Purdue

Syracuse

at Kansas

at Toledo

Ohio

at Northern Illinois

Ball State

at Buffalo

at Eastern Michigan

Miami (OH)

Western Michigan

Western Kentucky–Bahamas Bowl

References

Central Michigan
Central Michigan Chippewas football seasons
Central Michigan Chippewas football